Kolda North Airport  is an airport serving Kolda, the capital of the Kolda Region (also known as Haute Casamance) in Senegal.

Airlines and destinations

References

External links
 
 

Airports in Senegal
Kolda Region